Khooni Khanjar (Fighting Blade) is a 1930 Indian silent film directed by V. Shantaram.
The film was a costume action drama film co-directed by Keshavrao Dhaiber. It was produced by Prabhat Film Company. The cinematography was by Sheikh Fattelal and Vishnupant Govind Damle. The cast included Mane Pahelwan, Ganpat G. Shinde, P. Jairaj, Sakribai and Shankarrao Bhosle.

Shantaram had formed Prabhat Film Company in 1929 with Dhaiber, Damle and Fattelal and their first film Gopal Krishna was a big success commercially, which helped them produce five silent films in 1930–31. Khooni Khanjar was the first of them followed by Rani Saheba (1930), Udaykal (1930), Chandrasena (1931) and Zulum (1931).

Cast
 G. R. Mane
 Vijaya
 Shankarrao Bhosle
 Vasant
 Jai
 Sakribai
 Ganpat Shinde

References

External links

1930 films
Indian silent films
Prabhat Film Company films
Films directed by V. Shantaram
Indian black-and-white films